Saturn V dynamic test stand, also known as dynamic structural test facility, at the George C. Marshall Space Flight Center in Huntsville, Alabama is the test stand used for testing of the Saturn V rocket and the Space Shuttle prior to the vehicles' first flights. An elevator provides access to 15 levels in the structure, and a cable tunnel connects the building to control facilities in the space center's East Test Area.

NASA built the test stand  in 1964 to conduct mechanical and vibrational tests on the fully assembled Saturn V rocket. Major problems capable of causing failure of the vehicle were discovered and corrected here. The stand was used to test how spacecraft behaved when put under vibrating and bending stresses, and to test the connections between major stages of the craft.

It was declared a National Historic Landmark in 1985 for its role in the Saturn V program.

In addition to the Saturn V dynamic test vehicle, designated SA-500D, two Space Shuttle test vehicles, Pathfinder and Enterprise, were also tested in this facility.

See also
List of National Historic Landmarks in Alabama

References

External links

Aviation: From Sand Dunes to Sonic Booms, a National Park Service Discover Our Shared Heritage Travel Itinerary

National Historic Landmarks in Alabama
Marshall Space Flight Center
National Register of Historic Places in Huntsville, Alabama